This is a list of Spanish television related events in 1998.

Events 
 23 July: After 20 years in TVE  journalist Matías Prats Luque signs for rival channel Antena 3 and becomes star host of the News magazine Antena 3 Noticias.
 14 November: Pío Cabanillas Alonso is appointed Director General of RTVE.

Debuts

Television shows

Ending this year

Changes of network affiliation

Foreign series debuts in Spain

Deaths 

 2 May - Antonio Herrero, journalist, 43
 9 May - Adolfo Waitzman, composer, 68
 16 May - Mayrata O'Wisiedo, actress, 69
 12 June - Torrebruno, host, 61
 22 October - Ángel Picazo, actor, 81
 24 October - Rafael Alonso, actor, 78
 27 October - Luis Prendes, actor, 85
 22 November - José Antonio Plaza, director & host, 58
 27 November - Gloria Fuertes, poet, 81
 26 December - Tote García Ortega, actress, 83

See also
1998 in Spain
List of Spanish films of 1998

References 

1998 in Spanish television